California Noir - Chapter Two: Nightlife in Neon is the fourth studio album by American electronic rock band Julien-K. It is the second chapter of the concept album California Noir. The first chapter, Analog Beaches & Digital Cities, was released in 2015.

Background 
The two-part concept album was first announced in January 2015 via Facebook. An Indiegogo campaign was launched in order to finance the album. It started on May 3, 2016, and aimed for a goal of $10,000, which it reached within two hours; when the campaign ended 30 days later more than $43,000 had been collected.

Track listing

Personnel 
Julien-K
 Ryan Shuck – vocals, rhythm guitar
 Amir Derakh – lead guitar, bass, synthesizers, G-synth, programming
 Anthony 'Fu' Valcic – programming, synthesizers, bass

Production
 Amir Derakh – mixing, producer
 Brandon Belsky – additional engineering
 Eric Stoffel – additional engineering
 Nathaniel Peck – additional engineering

References

External links 
 Official track list
 length for track 8,9 and 10

Julien-K albums
2016 albums